49th National Board of Review Awards
December 19, 1977

Best Picture: 
 The Turning Point 
The 49th National Board of Review Awards were announced on December 19, 1977.

Top ten films 
The Turning Point
Annie Hall
Julia
Star Wars
Close Encounters of the Third Kind
The Late Show
Saturday Night Fever
Equus
The Picture Show Man
Harlan County, USA

Top foreign films 
That Obscure Object of Desire
The Man Who Loved Women
A Special Day
Cria!
The American Friend

Winners 
Best Picture: 
The Turning Point
Best Foreign Film: 
That Obscure Object of Desire
Best Actor: 
John Travolta - Saturday Night Fever
Best Actress: 
Anne Bancroft - The Turning Point
Best Supporting Actor: 
Tom Skerritt - The Turning Point
Best Supporting Actress: 
Diane Keaton - Annie Hall
Best Director: 
Luis Buñuel - That Obscure Object of Desire
Special Citation: 
Close Encounters of the Third Kind, for outstanding special effects
The Rescuers, for restoring and upgrading the art of animation

External links 
 National Board of Review of Motion Pictures  Awards for 1977

1977
1977 film awards
1977 in American cinema